Maria of Portugal (9 February 1313 – 18 January 1357) was a Portuguese princess who became Queen of Castile upon her marriage to Alfonso XI in 1328. She was the first daughter of King Afonso IV of Portugal and his first wife Beatrice of Castile.

Life 
In 1328, Maria married King Alfonso XI. As part of the dower, King Alfonso gave her Guadalajara, Talavera de la Reina and Olmedo.

The relationship between Maria and Alfonso was unhappy: from 1327 before their marriage, Alfonso had a relationship with Leonor de Guzmán who gave him ten children, including the future King Henry II of Castile. Maria did not participate in the affairs of the court, being relegated by the royal mistress Leonor and it is quite likely that she spent long periods secluded at the Royal Monastery of San Clemente in Seville.

In 1335, Maria returned to her father in Évora, who demanded that Alfonso separated from Leonor by use of alliances with the Pope, the Muslims and rebels inside Castile, and finally by an invasion. In the peace treaty of Seville in July 1340, Alfonso agreed to have Leonor imprisoned in a convent, thereby securing the support of the king of Portugal in the Battle of Río Salado which was fought on 30 October 1340, although, once the military conflict had been resolved, he returned to his lover and did not fulfill the promise he had made to the Portuguese monarch.

At the death of Alfonso 26 March 1350, Maria secured a power position by exerting influence upon the leader of her son's council, João Afonso de Albuquerque. She participated in the rebellion against her son in 1354, and turned over Toro to the rebels, which caused his imprisonment. After this, she returned to Portugal.

Children 
Fernando (1332–1333). He was buried in the monastery of San Clemente de Sevilla .
Peter of Castile (1334–1369), king of Castile and León at the death of his father in 1350. He married Maria de Padilla, Blanche of Bourbon and Jeanne de Castro. His remains lie today in the crypt of the royal chapel of the Cathedral of Seville.

Death and Burial 

María had executed a will in Valladolid on 8 November 1351 in which she asked to be buried at the Royal Chapel of the Cathedral of Seville where her husband Alfonso XI had been buried and that, if his remains were transferred to another church, hers should also be transferred and buried alongside her husband.

She died in Évora on 18 January 1357 and was buried there until, against the wishes expressed in her will, her remains were transferred to the Royal Monastery of San Clemente in Seville. In 1371, King Henry II had ordered that his father, King Alfonso XI, should receive burial at the Royal Collegiate Church of Saint Hippolytus in Córdoba and at the same time, he probably decided that María, who had been responsible for his mother's death, should be buried at the monastery in Seville. The gravestone made of simple tiles at the monastery mentions that she is buried there with two "tender infants".

Notes

References

Bibliography 

 
 
 

Castilian queen consorts
Leonese queen consorts
Galician queens consort
Portuguese infantas
House of Burgundy-Portugal
Burials at Seville Cathedral
1313 births
1357 deaths
14th-century Portuguese people
14th-century Portuguese women
14th-century Castilians
14th-century Spanish women
Daughters of kings
Queen mothers